Reverend Edward Tickner Edwardes (1865–1944) was an English writer, beekeeper, medical officer and priest. He wrote one of the earliest accounts of hitchhiking in 1910 – Lift-luck on Southern Roads.  He served in the Royal Army Medical Corps during the First World War, serving in Gallipoli and running a laboratory in Egypt.  After the war, he was ordained as a priest in the Church of England and became the vicar of Burpham.

Life

Beekeeping and writing
Edwardes was an enthusiastic beekeeper and wrote many books about the subject.  He was an active member of the Sussex Beekeepers' Association and attended their meetings regularly.  He designed the 'Tickner Edwardes' beehive which took standard British frames but was heavily insulated, and the simplified Unit Hive for commercial beekeeping which had identical brood chambers and honey supers.

At that time he lived in the Red Cottage on the main street of Burpham.  He also had another cottage as a literary retreat as he continued to write books and contribute to periodicals.   His Lift-Luck on Southern Roads is thought to be the earliest published account of hitchhiking.

Edwardes wrote a novel Tansy about a shepherdess on the Sussex Downs.  This was made into a silent film in 1921, directed by Cecil Hepworth, also titled Tansy.

Military service
Edwardes was already an established writer and in his late forties at the outbreak of war. He served in the RAMC in Gallipoli and Egypt in The Great War.  He ran a laboratory in Cairo and then when posted back to the UK, he served in the 1st London Sanitary Company and then the Anti-Malarial Research Laboratory at Sandwich.  He started the war as a private but finished with a commission and the rank of Captain.

Clergyman
He was Rector of Folkington from 1925 to 1927 and Vicar of Burpham in West Sussex from 1927 until his retirement in 1935. He and his wife Kathleen had four children – a son and three daughters.  His son, Edward, became an RAF pilot but died in a crash in Aden in 1928.  Tickner himself died on 29 December 1944 and was buried in St Mary's Church in Burpham.

John Cowper Powys was a friend and neighbour in Burpham. He wrote: "Edwardes was a man of meticulous nicety in his literary art. I recollect being confounded by the elaborate craftsmanship with which he laboured; pondering on words, taking words up, as it were, and laying them down, just as he did with the materials of his hives!"  Powys especially "liked the toughwood texture of his bodily presence ... His long nose, his opaque, ivory-parchment skin, his tree-root neck, his shy, nervous, wild-animal brown eyes ... He possessed that grave, solid, imperturbable reserve, that stiff pride, mixed with disarming spasms of humility, that have characterized so many of the old-fashioned interpreters of English piety."

Works
An Idler in the Wilds 1906
The Bee-master of Warrilow 1907 
The Lore of the Honey-bee 1909
Lift-luck on Southern Roads 1910
Neighbourhood; a year's life in and about an English village 1911
Side-lights of Nature in Quill and Crayon 1912
The Honey-Star 1913
Tansy 1914 
Bees As Rent Payers 1914
With the RAMC in Egypt 1918
The Seventh Wave	 1922
Bee-Keeping For All: A Manual Of Honey-Craft 1923
Bee-Keeping Do's And Dont's 1925
Sunset Bride	 1927
Life's Silver Lining	 1927
A Country Calendar 1928
Eve, The Enemy 1931
A Downland Year 1939

References

External links
 The Red Cottage – one of three houses in Burpham in which Edwardes lived

1865 births
1944 deaths
British beekeepers
English Anglican priests
English writers
Royal Army Medical Corps officers